Cheshmeh Gondeh (also known as Cheshmeh Gandāb and Cheshmeh Ḩamzeh ‘Alī) is a village in Sefid Sang Rural District, Qalandarabad District, Fariman County, Razavi Khorasan Province, Iran. At the 2006 census, its population was 134, in 25 families.

References 

Populated places in Fariman County